Per-Olof Bild (born 13 December 1949) is a former Swedish football player.

During his club career, Bild played for Östers IF and Högadals IS.

Bild made two appearances for the Sweden national football team, both coming in 1980.

External links

1949 births
Swedish footballers
Sweden international footballers
Allsvenskan players
Östers IF players
Association football defenders
Living people